The Enterprise Unified Process (EUP) is an extended variant of the Unified Process and was developed by Scott W. Ambler and Larry Constantine in 2000, eventually reworked in 2005 by Ambler, John Nalbone and Michael Vizdos.  EUP was originally introduced to overcome some shortages of RUP, namely the lack of production and eventual retirement of a software system. So two phases and several new disciplines were added.  EUP sees software development not as a standalone activity, but embedded in the lifecycle of the system (to be built or enhanced or replaced), the IT lifecycle of the enterprise and the organization/business lifecycle of the enterprise itself. It deals with software development as seen from the customer's point of view.

In 2013 work began to evolve EUP to be based on Disciplined Agile Delivery instead of the Unified Process.

Phases
The Unified Process defines four project phases
 Inception  
 Elaboration
 Construction
 Transition
To these EUP adds two additional phases
 Production
 Retirement

Disciplines
The Rational Unified Process defines nine project disciplines
 Business Modeling
 Requirements
 Analysis and Design
 Implementation
 Test
 Deployment
 Configuration and Change Management
 Project Management
 Environment
To these EUP adds one additional project discipline
 Operations and Support
and seven enterprise disciplines
 Enterprise Business Modeling
 Portfolio Management
 Enterprise Architecture
 Strategic Reuse
 People Management
 Enterprise Administration
 Software Process Improvement

Best Practices of EUP
The EUP provide following best practices:-
Develop iteratively
Manage requirements
Proven architecture
Modeling
Continuously verify quality.
Manage change
Collaborative development
Look beyond development.
Deliver working software on a regular basis
Manage risk

See also
 Disciplined Agile Delivery
Rational Unified Process
Software development process
Extreme programming

References

Bibliography

External links
 Scott W. Ambler's website on the Enterprise Unified Process
 The website of co-author Michael Vizdos

Software development process
Software project management